Rabbi Menachem Brod (or Brodt) is a senior Chabad rabbi from Kfar Chabad, Israel.  He is the spokesman of the Chabad youth movement center Tze'irei Agudas Chabad in Israel and the editor of the nationally distributed Chabad weekly pamphlet Sichat HaShavua. After the passing of previous Chabad spokesman Berke Volf, Brod became almost the only official Chabad spokesman in the Israeli media. He also has a regular column in the local weekly magazine known as the Kfar Chabad and is considered a popular Haredi writer.

Life 
Brod was born in Ches Kislev 5720 (9 December 1959) in Riga Latvia. At age five his family made an Aliyah to Eretz Yisrael. in his teens he learnt in the Chabad Yeshiva in Lod and Kefar Chabad.

For the school year of 1981 he spent in New York learning in the Central Lubavitch Yeshiva.

Brod married Miriam (Ruderman). After he married he went on Shlichus in Bat-Yam. later on he moved to Kefar Chabad.

In the year 1983 he began working (as the publicity manager) for Tze'irei Agudas Chabad in Israel. in 1986 He became spokesman of the Chabad youth movement center Tze'irei Agudas Chabad in Israel.

The following year (1987) he began publishing the nationally distributed Chabad weekly pamphlet Sichat HaShavua.

Works 
 Yemot HaMashiach on the belief in the Moshiach
 "Lehavin Chasidus" explain common concepts in the Chabad Chasidic thought (2018)
 "Me'imkei Nishmas" Chassidic explanations on the prayer of Nishmat (2019)

References 

Chabad-Lubavitch rabbis
Hasidic rabbis in Israel
Living people
Spokespersons
Hasidic writers
Year of birth missing (living people)